Lütjenburg is an Amt ("collective municipality") in the district of Plön, in Schleswig-Holstein, Germany. It is situated around Lütjenburg, which is the seat of the Amt.

Subdivision
The Amt Lütjenburg-Land consists of the following municipalities:

Behrensdorf 
Blekendorf 
Dannau 
Giekau
Helmstorf 
Högsdorf 
Hohenfelde 
Hohwacht 
Kirchnüchel 
Klamp 
Kletkamp 
Lütjenburg 
Panker 
Schwartbuck
Tröndel

References 

Ämter in Schleswig-Holstein